Andrew James Lock OAM (born 26 December 1961) is an Australian high-altitude mountaineer. He became the first, and still remains the only, Australian to climb all 14 "eight-thousanders" (the peaks over 8,000-metres above sea level) on 2 October 2009, and is the 18th person to ever complete this feat.  He climbed 13 of the 14 without using bottled oxygen, only using it on Mount Everest, which he has summited three times. He retired from eight-thousander climbing in 2012.

Climbing

His preferred climbing style is in very small teams, mostly climbing without even sherpa support, and without the use of bottled oxygen (except on Everest). His physical ability to perform at high altitude has been noted by other Himalayan climbers. The term "gritty" is often used to describe Lock, and he is noted for his understated and self-deprecating manner. Unusually for a long-standing high-altitude climber, Lock has lost no digits to frostbite. Climbing all 14 eight-thousanders, and surviving, is an uncommon feat as the deaths-to-summits ratio on some of the mountains is at one-in-five (including Annapurna, K2, Nanga Parbat, Kangchenjunga), and it often takes more than one attempt, on average, to climb an eight-thousander (Lock has an overall eight-thousander success rate of circa 50%).

He has achieved six first Australian ascents of eight-thousanders, namely Dhaulagiri, Nanga Parbat, Hidden Peak, Manaslu, Annapurna, and Shishapangma.  He has made four solo ascents of eight-thousanders, namely Lhotse, Broad Peak, Shishapangma Central and Cho Oyu. He summited Mount Everest twice.

His first 8,000-metre summit was of K2, which he climbed in 1993 with a small team that included legendary Himalayan climber Anatoli Boukreev, who later died in 1997 on Annapurna. The "Savage Mountain" lived up to its fearsome reputation when three of his summit partners were killed in separate falls (on the same face), and Lock rescued a Swedish climber.

In 2004, he was a climber and cinematographer for the acclaimed Discovery Channel six-part miniseries, Discovery Channel-Ultimate Survival: Everest, which has been broadcast many times in North America. On that expedition, Lock had to rescue three members of other teams coming down from the summit, giving up his own oxygen along the way.

Lock has climbed with several leading high-altitude Himalayan mountaineers, including Anatoli Boukreev (K2 in 1993), Göran Kropp (Broad Peak in 1994), Doug Scott and Wojciech Kurtyka (Nanga Parbat Mazeno Ridge in 1995), and Iván Vallejo & Iñaki Ochoa de Olza (Annapurna 2007). After Ecuadorian Iván Vallejo, Lock is the second, and still the only other, Southern Hemisphere climber to complete all 14 eight-thousanders.

While Lock has climbed with partners that he did not particularly enjoy, or get on with, his unhappy experience when climbing with U.K. mountaineer Alan Hinkes (who claims to have climbed all 14 eight-thousanders, although one is disputed), on Nanga Parbat in 1998, is recounted in his book, Summit 8000.

In May 2011, Lock attempted Everest for the third time, but his first without supplementary oxygen (to complete the rarer Reinhold Messner feat of climbing all 14 eight-thousanders without oxygen).  His solo climb of Everest's North Ridge was unsuccessful due to high winds and blizzard conditions. Lock made a second attempt to summit Everest solo, via the North side, without supplementary oxygen in May 2012, but abandoned the climb 300 metres from the summit due to self diagnosed early symptoms of Cerebral Oedema. [This was incorrectly reported as High altitude pulmonary oedema].

Lock retired from personal high-altitude climbing after his 2012 Everest experience, however, a final "oxygenless" ascent of Everest (his third Everest ascent), remains a potential project. He continues to guide commercial expeditions to Mt Everest and other peaks in the Himalaya and around the world, specialising in small teams with high logistical support.

Personal

In 2009 Lock was awarded the Australian Geographic Society's Adventurer of the Year award. On 13 June 2011, Lock was awarded the Medal of the Order of Australia for service to mountaineering.

Lock is an ambassador of the Sir David Martin Foundation.

Lock is the author of SUMMIT 8000 which was published in Australia and New Zealand in 2014, and MASTER OF THIN AIR, which was published in the United States of America in 2015.  Both books relate to his journey to climb the fourteen 8000-metre peaks.

8,000-metre summits
1993 K2 (8,611 metres) – first Australian ascent through Pakistan
1997 Dhaulagiri (8,167 metres) – first Australian ascent
1997 Broad Peak (8,048 metres)  – solo ascent
1998 Nanga Parbat (8,125 metres) – first Australian ascent
1999 Hidden Peak (8,068 metres) – first Australian ascent
1999 Gasherbrum II (8,035 metres) – Alpine-style ascent
2000 Mount Everest (8,848 metres) – first Australian to lead a commercial expedition to the summit of Mt. Everest
2002 Manaslu (8,163 metres) – first Australian ascent
2002 Lhotse (8,516 metres) – solo ascent
2003 Shishapangma Central (8,008 metres) – solo ascent
2004 Everest (8,848 metres) – second personal ascent; Discovery Channel expedition climber and cameraman
2004 Cho Oyu (8,201 metres) – solo ascent
2005 Cho Oyu (8,201 metres) – second personal ascent; commercial expedition leader
2005 Shishapangma Central (8008 metres) – second personal ascent; commercial expedition leader
2006 Kangchenjunga (8,596 metres) – second Australian ascent
2007 Annapurna (8,091 metres) – first Australian ascent
2008 Makalu (8,496 metres)
2009 Shishapangma Main Summit (8,027 metres) – first Australian ascent

See also
List of Mount Everest summiters by number of times to the summit

Filmography

Bibliography

References

External links

Andrew Lock Guiding website 

Australian mountain climbers
Australian motivational speakers
Living people
1961 births
Australian summiters of Mount Everest
Summiters of all 14 eight-thousanders
People educated at Sydney Grammar School
Recipients of the Medal of the Order of Australia
Summiters of K2